Friedrich Percyval Reck-Malleczewen (11 August 1884 – February 1945) was a German author. His best-known work is Diary of a Man in Despair, a journal in which he expressed his passionate opposition to Adolf Hitler and Nazism. He was eventually arrested by the Nazis and died at the Dachau concentration camp.

Life and work

Friedrich (Fritz) Reck-Malleczewen was born on the estate of Malleczewen, Masuria (Maleczewo, Poland), the son of the Prussian politician and landowner Hermann Reck. He originally wanted to be a musician, and at one point studied medicine in Innsbruck. He served as an officer in the Prussian Army but was dismissed due to diabetes, and later married Anna Louise Büttner in 1908. They had three daughters and a son before divorcing in 1930.

Graduating in 1911, Reck was a ship's doctor, in American waters, for a year. Thereafter he moved to Stuttgart to become a journalist and theatre critic for the Süddeutsche Zeitung, moving to Pasing near Munich in 1914. In 1933 Reck converted to Catholicism, and in 1935 he married Irmgard von Borcke, with whom he had another three daughters.

Throughout the 1920s and 1930s, Reck was also a novelist, mainly of children's adventure stories. One book, Bomben auf Monte Carlo, has been filmed four times. Many of his books were banned by the Nazis, and more were not published until years after his death. In 1937 he published a historical novel on the Münster rebellion, Bockelson: History of a Mass Delusion, seen as a critical allegory of Hitler and Nazism. Today his best-known work is Diary of a Man in Despair (Tagebuch eines Verzweifelten), his journal of life under Nazi rule (which he vehemently opposed). It was published for the first time in 1947, republished in 1970 in English translation by Paul Rubens, and reissued by New York Review Books in 2013.

Arrest and death

Reck noted in his journal, in October 1944, that the Nazi authorities were becoming suspicious of him. On 13 October, he was arrested and charged with the serious offence of "undermining the morale of the armed forces," which could be punished by death on the guillotine. After some days in prison, he was released following the surprise intervention of an SS general. However, he was arrested again on 31 December and charged with "insulting the German currency." This appeared to be the result of a letter he had written to his publisher, in which he had complained that the inflation rate was eroding the value of his royalties. On 9 January 1945, he was transferred to the Dachau concentration camp, where accounts of his death differ; one source suggests that Reck was executed there 23 February, shot in the neck (Genickschuss), while the official death certificate recorded a death from typhus on February 16.

Bibliography 
Uradel, 1914
Mit Admiral Spee, 1936 (written 1914/15)
Aus Tsingtau entkommen, 1916
Der Admiral der Roten Flagge, 1917
Monteton, 1924
Die Siedlung Unitrusttown, 1925
Frau Übersee, 1926
Liebesreigen und Fanfaren, 1927
Die Dame aus New York, 1928 
Sven entdeckt das Paradies, 1928
Jean Paul Marat, 1929
Bomben auf Monte Carlo, 1930
Des Tieres Fall, 1931
Hundertmark, 1934
Krach um Payta, 1935
Ein Mannsbild namens Prack, 1935
Sophie Dorothee, 1936
Bockelson, 1937
La Paloma, 1937
Spiel im Park, 1937
Der grobe Brief, 1940
Diana Pontecorvo, 1944
Das Ende der Termiten, 1946
Charlotte Corday, 1947
Tagebuch eines Verzweifelten, 1947 (Diary of a Man in Despair)

References

1884 births
1945 deaths
People from East Prussia

German people who died in Dachau concentration camp
German civilians killed in World War II
People from Ełk County
German male writers
German Roman Catholics
Catholic Righteous Among the Nations